Overbrook Entertainment is an American production company based in Culver City, California. It was founded by partners Will Smith and James Lassiter in 1998, around the same time production for Wild Wild West (1999) was started.

The name "Overbrook" is derived from Will Smith's neighborhood in West Philadelphia. The company produces music, films and television shows. Smith claimed to have started the company in order to serve as producer and find roles. He uses his role in the company to help unknown artists record music and also records music for some of his films in Overbrook.

History 
On November 11, 1997, actor Will Smith  (age 29) and manager James Lassiter signed an overall first-look term deal at Universal Pictures. Thus, Overbrook Entertainment was born. It was formally incorporated on February 2, 1998.

On September 16, 1998, David Tochterman, formerly employee of The Carsey-Werner Company, joined the company and decided to launch the television division. Tochterman produced shows for the broadcast and cable TV networks.

On February 11, 1999, the music division is restructured with John Dukakis, formerly employee of Southpaw Entertainment, signed on as executive vice president of its music division.

On May 10, 2000, it was announced that a merger with The Firm was proposed, but it was scrapped.

On December 10, 2000, Overbrook Entertainment is renewing its interest in the television division. Its plans was to include a 13-episode animated series commitment for Nickelodeon, as well as a slew of comedy, drama, and telemovies on the broadcast networks. The studio is landing deals for three sitcoms, three dramas and one telefilm for the webnetworks.

On January 30, 2002, the studio's contract with Universal Pictures ended. It formally signed a contract with Sony Pictures Entertainment to develop feature films.

On January 3, 2018, it was announced that the studio wouldn't renew its deal with Sony Pictures Entertainment.

On July 10, 2019, Will Smith and Jada Pinkett Smith announced the formation of Westbrook Inc., with Overbrook Entertainment being as one of the subsidiaries of the company. It is reported that the Westbrook Studios company would sign a deal with National Geographic.

Filmography

Films

2000s

2010s

2020s

Television

2000s

2010s

Soundtrack

Distribution

References

American record labels
Film production companies of the United States
1998 establishments in California
Record labels based in California
Record labels established in 1998
Hip hop record labels
Will Smith
Companies based in Culver City, California